Felicia Lily Dobson (born February 28, 1985) is a Canadian singer and songwriter. Born in Toronto, Ontario, she began performing as a teenager, during which time she received and refused an offer from Jive Records for a recording contract. Dobson signed with Island/Def Jam soon after and released her self-titled debut album (2003), which saw the success of the singles "Bye Bye Boyfriend" and "Don't Go (Girls and Boys)" on the Canadian Hot 100 chart and for which she received two Juno Award nominations.

Dobson's second studio album Sunday Love was originally scheduled for release in 2005, but after complications during production, its mainstream release was cancelled and she left her record label due to creative differences (the album was released independently in 2006 and later made available for digital download in 2012). She was re-signed to Island Records during production of her third studio album Joy (2010), whose singles "Ghost" and "Stuttering" saw continued success on the Canadian Hot 100. Dobson's music has been covered by other artists and featured in films, television, and more.

Biography

Dobson was born on February 28, 1985, in Scarborough, Ontario, a suburb of Toronto. Dobson's mother is of English, Dutch, First Nations, and Irish ancestry and her father is of Jamaican heritage. She went to high school at Wexford Collegiate Institute. During her childhood, she took singing lessons at the New Conservatory of Music in Agincourt, Scarborough to improve her singing. Fefe Dobson graduated from Heritage Park Public School.

Dobson began sending demo tapes – recorded on a home karaoke machine – to many recording companies in North America when she was 11 years old. Then at the age of 13, she started playing the piano.
Before Dobson was signed, she said that she had been stereotyped as a contemporary R&B or popular music singer instead of a rock musician due to her race, often being compared to Brandy Norwood and Britney Spears.
Dobson started writing music at the age of 13 years, and the company Jive Records attempted to develop her as a popular musician, which she eventually refused. After that experience, Dobson met Jay Levine and contracted with Nelly Furtado's manager Chris Smith. Smith arranged showcases with several recording companies. Universal Music Canada president Randy Lennox showed interest in her, and persuaded Island Def Jam CEO Lyor Cohen and his manager of A&R, Jeff Fenster, to fly to Toronto for another showcase. Dobson played a showcase for Island/Def Jam; about 30 seconds into the first song – a punk thrash track about longing, titled "Stupid Little Love Song" – the executives contracted her.

2003–2005: Fefe Dobson

Dobson's self-titled debut album was released December 9, 2003, by Island Records, and sold 307,000 copies in the United States, according to Nielsen SoundScan as quoted by Billboard. The album debuted at number one on the Billboard Heatseekers Albums Chart. Four singles were released from the album: "Bye Bye Boyfriend", "Take Me Away", "Everything", and "Don't Go (Girls and Boys)". There is an official music video for each of the singles. Two of the album's tracks, "Everything" and "Unforgiven", were used in the film The Perfect Score.  The New York Times reviewer wrote:  "The album's assiduous, ungrammatical crux is in 'Kiss Me Fool': 'Tell me whom I should be to make you love me. When in recording studios, Dobson hung up inspirational pictures of Kurt Cobain, Judy Garland, Coldplay, Jeff Buckley, and The Vines to help motivate her and to commemorate the artists who influenced her. Dobson was also heavily influenced by Jay Levine and James Bryan McCollum of the Canadian band Prozzäk, who co-wrote and helped produce her debut album.
During much of 2004, Dobson promoted her debut album, performing live on the program Total Request Live and for numerous magazine covers and articles. She was also the opening act of Justin Timberlake's European tour. That July, she released a new single, "Don't Go (Girls and Boys)", which was also featured in a Tommy Hilfiger commercial featuring the singer. The album was later reissued with that single added. Dobson also had a new song, "If You Walk Away", on the soundtrack of Raising Helen.

Dobson was an endorser for the Got Milk? organization.

Dobson released the record "Truth Anthem" on the Much Dance 2005 CD compilation, a benefit for the Canadian branch of War Child. It was recorded at Metalworks Studios in Mississauga, Ontario. In April 2005, Dobson was nominated for two Juno Awards, Pop Album of the Year and New Artist of the Year; both but lost both categories. During the summer of 2005, Dobson was in a public service ad: "Make Poverty History", which brings awareness to child poverty worldwide.

Writers she collaborated with during the recording process include Holly Knight, Nina Gordon, Kay Hanley, John 5, Billy Steinberg, Matthew Wilder, Cyndi Lauper, Courtney Love, Joan Jett, and Rancid's Tim Armstrong. Sunday Love was not released at the time, due to Dobson being terminated by Island Records just days before the album was scheduled for release. The album was reviewed favorably in both Spin and Vibe magazine. "My real good fans, my hardcore fans, have it, so that's most important," Dobson says. "At least it got out there to a few hands, and now it's time to make a record on my own terms." "It was sad," says Dobson. "But instead of sitting there and being depressed and begging people for the record, I went back to the studio, got people that I knew, friends that I knew, and I started again."
One song from the unreleased album, "Be Strong", featured on the soundtrack for the film It's a Boy Girl Thing.

In February 2006, Dobson sang "O Canada" at All-Star Saturday Night, part of the 2006 NBA All-Star Weekend in Houston, Texas. During spring 2006, she performed several shows around the United States, and began promoting the record Sunday Love in anticipation of its release. The first single, "Don't Let It Go to Your Head", was released in 2005 but did not chart. There is an official music video for the song. A second single, "This Is My Life" was released in 2006. No video was made for it, and it also did not chart.
Dobson's song "Don't Let It Go to Your Head" is covered by Lilyjets, a Norwegian girl group, as a single on their debut album 3rd Floor (2006). They also produced an official music video.
The music of "This Is My Life" is used by the Taiwanese girl-group S.H.E in their song: "I Love Trouble" (我愛煩惱) on their album FM S.H.E (2008).

"Start All Over", a song co-written by Dobson and featuring her on background vocals, was recorded by Miley Cyrus for her album Hannah Montana 2: Meet Miley Cyrus (2007) and was released as a single, reaching number 57 on the Billboard Pop 100. During a 2009 interview Dobson said, "I wrote a song, she dug it, and she sang it. But I didn't want it for my record. It just wasn't right for me, and I just felt like it was better for someone else, and she does a great job on it. I was really impressed. She sounded great. I'm actually happier she did it than I did it."

"Don't Let It Go to Your Head" was also covered by Rockett Queen on their album Kiss and Tell (2008) and Jordin Sparks on her second album Battlefield (2009). Shortly after Sparks' album was released Dobson said, "Jordin Sparks just did [that song], which was on Sunday Love, which was very cool. She did kind of, like, a more R&B version of it, which I think is really nice, actually. It was really cool that she didn't try and do a rock version of it, and she did what she's more comfortable with, which I thought was awesome." The Sparks' version was released as a single in the UK on January 4, 2010.
The track "As a Blonde" is covered on the Selena Gomez & the Scene debut album Kiss & Tell (2009). Sunday Love finally received a digital release on December 18, 2012.

2009–2012: Joy
On August 11, 2009, Dobson presented a showcase performance at the Mercury Lounge in New York City. In an interview at the showcase Dobson mused, "It's almost like when an animal is in a small cage, but when you let it out it's running around like crazy. That's how I feel when I'm onstage."
Dobson performed during the 2009 MTV Video Music Awards weekend at The Fillmore New York at Irving Plaza on Friday night, September 11, at "A Concert with Fefe Dobson and Cobra Starship." She was also one of the judges for a competition for MTV's "VMA Best Breakout New York City Artist Award" that occurred at the same event. Dobson attended the 2009 MTV Video Music Awards held on September 13 in New York City at Radio City Music Hall.
On Sunday, September 27, 2009, she performed "I Want You" at the finale of the second season of the Canadian Cable TV show The Next Star.
Dobson's song, "I Want You" is in at least three versions of TV Spot ads for the movie Whip It. The 2009 film is the directorial debut of Drew Barrymore. The song was also used for television advertisements in 2010 for programs on the Style network.
She performed in Perth, Australia, at the One Movement Showcase Music Festival on October 17, 2009.
Dobson was the headline performer for one of the National Breast Cancer Awareness Month events, a benefit concert held at the Hard Rock Cafe in Hollywood, CA on October 22, 2009.
She performed at a 100 Day Countdown event to the Vancouver, British Columbia, Canada, 2010 Winter Olympics at the Canadian Embassy in Washington, D.C., USA on November 4, 2009. Six songs were heard but her energetic performance resulted in a clothing mishap. Dobson even incorporated the happening into her performance by ad-libbing, "I-I-I just split my pants and I don't care".

Dobson performed on February 20, 2010, at Nathan Phillips Square in Toronto, Ontario, as part of CTV's national celebration of the 2010 Winter Olympics. She was one of the opening acts for The Barenaked Ladies in the all Canadian show.
She participated in the Canadian All-Star Benefit Single For Haiti released under the collaboration name of Young Artists for Haiti. The song is a reworked version of K'naan's single "Wavin' Flag" and was released on March 12, 2010. Dobson is seen and heard in the official video at the recording studio as she lent her vocals.
Dobson's involvement with the Olympics continued on March 12, 2010, as she performed "I Want You" and "Watch Me Move" at the Opening Ceremonies for the 2010 Paralympic Winter Games.
She covered "River Deep – Mountain High" for the Rock and Roll Hall of Fame's 25th annual induction ceremony at the Waldorf-Astoria Hotel in New York City on March 15, 2010. It inspired a reviewer to state that it, "...was an eye-opening version of Greenwich & Barry's "River Deep, Mountain High" by Canadian belter Fefe Dobson that was so good it makes you want to go out and buy all her music."
Dobson performed on a twenty city tour across Canada in March and April 2010 on Hedley's The Show Must Go...On The Road Tour. Hedley announced the tour in support of their new album The Show Must Go which was released November 17, 2009. "Fefe Dobson and Stereos will be along for the whole trek, while Faber Drive and Boys Like Girls will support on select dates."

"Joy" Dobson's second studio album was released on November 22, 2010, after taking almost four years to complete. It candidly follows Dobson's evolution as an artist as well as transition from the indie type of music she originally put together for Joy, to the mainstream pop hits. The album was preceded by the release of the two buzz singles "Watch Me Move" and "I Want You", which were then followed-up by the three top 20 official singles "Ghost", "Stuttering" and "Can't Breathe", all of which have at least one music video. The singer performed her single "Stuttering" on the November 10, 2010, broadcast of The CW Television Network series, Hellcats. Dobson performed live shows with Blue Man Group's drummer Colin Robinson (also featured in "If You Walk Away"). In 2010, the singer released a remix of her single "Stuttering", featuring G.O.O.D Music artist, Pusha T of Clipse. She released her third single, "Can't Breathe" which features guitarist Orianthi, in March 2011. It peaked at number 19 on the Canadian Hot 100.

She performed at the 2010 Toronto International Film Festival in September 2010.
Dobson also has a role in Selena Gomez's music career. On their debut CD, Kiss & Tell, Dobson allowed Gomez and her band to re-record "As a Blonde" from her unreleased album, Sunday Love. Dobson also sang backup vocals. Then, she helped write the lead single, "Round & Round", from the band's second studio album, A Year Without Rain, alongside Kevin Rudolf and others.

2013–2018: Single releases
On January 22, 2013, Dobson announced that recording had begun for her fourth studio album – later revealed to be titled Firebird – with a release date yet to be confirmed. The album's lead single "Legacy" was released on August 6, 2013, while the song "Celebrate" was released February 11, 2014. as a promotional single to support the Canadian representatives in the 2014 Winter Olympics in Sochi, Russia. The album's second single "In Better Hands" was released on March 18, 2014.

In early July 2013, Dobson got engaged to her boyfriend American rapper Yelawolf; the pair were married on September 27, 2019, in Nashville, Tennessee. On April 29, 2014, Dobson performed live during the Count Me In conference global broadcast, filmed at the Sony Centre for the Performing Arts.

On July 27, 2018, Dobson released her latest single "Save Me From LA," saying "It took me some time to place the pieces, find my team and that perfect person to be creative with."

2022–present: New album
In early 2022, Dobson confirmed her return to music with the single "FCKN IN LOVE", which was released on 25 February 2022, and a new album, her first since 2010.

In 2023, she participated in an all-star recording of Serena Ryder's single "What I Wouldn't Do", which was released as a charity single to benefit Kids Help Phone's Feel Out Loud campaign for youth mental health.

Artistry

Musical style
Fefe Dobson's self-titled debut album is generally pop-rock, as well as some traces of punk music. Several songs on the album are also in an acoustic format, stripped down to just Dobson and the guitar. The music was different from most music put out at the time, such as recent releases by Britney Spears and Christina Aguilera. In fact, Dobson originally signed with Jive Records, who intended to make her the next big pop star. However, Dobson didn't want to be a pop-star and wanted to make her own type of music, and quickly left the label. On Dobson's second official album Joy, she worked with producers David Lichens, Jon Levine, Howard Benson and Bob Ezrin - living up to the portraits of her heroes she first hung during the recording of her first album: Kurt Cobain, Judy Garland, Coldplay, The Vines and Jeff Buckley. Dobson co-wrote most of the songs on the album - usually composing on guitar, her instrument of choice. "I play the few chords that I know," she says. "I try to write melodies off the same chords. Joy is written with about three chords, and an extra one in the bridge." Sonically the album was rooted alternative rock.

Influences
Dobson has said that John Lennon and Judy Garland are her primary musical influences, and that her biggest musical inspiration growing up was Michael Jackson: "I swore I was Michael [Jackson]. Then I found out I wasn't Michael [Jackson] and it broke my heart." She also mentions Janet Jackson as a primary influence. At the same time, she went to "every 'N Sync concert there was."
Dobson indicated that she would like to work with Jack White, the White Stripes/Raconteurs frontman, because she admires him for his ability to make his ragged rock music become radio-style.

Filmography

Discography

 Fefe Dobson (2003)
 Sunday Love (2006)
 Joy (2010)

Awards and nominations

References

External links

 
 

1985 births
Living people
21st-century Canadian actresses
21st-century Black Canadian women singers
Actresses from Toronto
Black Canadian actresses
Canadian film actresses
Canadian people of Jamaican descent
Canadian television actresses
Canadian women pop singers
Canadian women rock singers
Canadian women singer-songwriters
Def Jam Recordings artists
Island Records artists
Mercury Records artists
Musicians from Toronto
People from Scarborough, Toronto
Pop punk singers
Universal Music Group artists
Women punk rock singers